Jean Duncan is an International Hockey Umpire from Scotland.

She has umpired at 2002 Commonwealth Games, 2002 and 2006 Women's Hockey World Cup and 2004 Olympic Games.

References

Women's field hockey umpires
Scottish field hockey umpires
Living people
Scottish women referees and umpires
Year of birth missing (living people)